Callinectes bellicosus is a species of swimming crab in the genus Callinectes. They are native to warm waters and shorelines in Mexico. They are prepared and eaten in the same manner as blue crabs.

References

External links
 Callinectes bellicosus info

Portunoidea
Crustaceans of the eastern Pacific Ocean
Crustaceans described in 1859